The Rapsody Overture: Hip Hop Meets Classic is a concept album of remixes consisting of hip hop and classical, which combined American rappers with European opera singers. It was released in 1997 by Mercury Records and distributed by Def Jam Recordings.

"Prince Igor" was a #1 hit across Europe in 1998, a duet between American rapper Warren G and Norwegian singer Sissel. Sissel sang an aria from  Alexander Borodin's opera Prince Igor during the chorus, while Warren G rapped.

The Xzibit track "E Lucean Le Stelle" contains a sample from Giacomo Puccini's E Lucevan Le Stelle, though it is misspelled.

Track listing

Track listing 

New version with different track listing on April 21, 1998

References

1997 remix albums
Hip hop remix albums
1997 compilation albums
Hip hop compilation albums
Mercury Records remix albums
Def Jam Recordings remix albums
Def Jam Recordings compilation albums
Mercury Records compilation albums